"Alive with the Glory of Love" is the first single from Say Anything's second album ...Is a Real Boy. "Alive with the Glory of Love" was released to radio on June 20, 2006. The song was a hit for the band, charting at number twenty-eight on the Alternative Songs chart.

Song meaning
The song, described as an "intense and oddly uplifting rocker about a relationship torn by the Holocaust," by the Pittsburgh Post-Gazette, is actually semi-biographical in nature, telling the story of songwriter and vocalist Max Bemis's grandparents, both of whom were Holocaust survivors. The song documents the love between two individuals as they live their lives in the ghetto, in hiding, and in the work camp. In an interview, Bemis said: "I thought about what it would be like to be in love and be separated from the person you love, because these times are just as dire in a way. Anything can happen, in a war and terrorist attacks and cynicism and all these actors who oppose love."

Naming the song as one of the 100 greatest emo songs of all time, music writer Ian Cohen described the song as "a wildly ambitious and irresponsibly horny piece of musical theater" that "visualized how the primal, procreative urge can still thrive when dead bodies are piling up by the thousands in front of you."

Music video
The music video goes between shots of the band playing in front of a tree and a preteen boy who is sleeping in what we are to believe is a camp. During the night the boy wakes up fully dressed, and equipped with a flashlight sneaks out of his bunk. At the same time, a girl (played by Chloe Greenfield) in another bunk also awakes and steals off into the night. Running out of the camp he descends a flight of stairs while his female companion sneaks out of her cabin. Numerous official looking guards enter both former cabins doing a bed check, and upon finding the empty beds, the lead guard in the female cabin blows a whistle waking up the entire camp, suggesting that this is something other than an ordinary summer camp. All the lights are turned on throughout the camp including large spotlights on towers illuminating the scene while the guards spread out with flashlights. Both continue to run through the woods separated from each other while the guards follow until they reach a large chain link and barbed wire fence. Upon reaching the fence and realizing their situation, they kiss while lights from the other side of the fence illuminate the scene. Escaping through a gap they come upon the band playing to a small crowd. As the guards continue to search now accompanied by German Shepherds both the boy and girl easily blend in with the rest of the crowd. As the band continues to play they crowd surf and when the guards arrive they find a closed gate with no trace of either the children or the band.

The music video has a lot of Holocaust imagery in it, including the bed checks and the camp setting, reminiscent of the work camps that were dotted throughout Europe during the Second World War. The video along with the lyrics ultimately suggest the deeper meaning of this song, which is based on lead singer Max Bemis's grandparents' survival of the holocaust.

The female guard that blows the whistle is the actress Carina Rhea.

Track listing
Promo single
"Alive with the Glory of Love" (Intro Edit)  – 4:03
"Alive with the Glory of Love" (Album Version)  – 4:15

Red Ink Records release
"Alive with the Glory of Love"  – 4:15
"Slumming it with Johnny"  – 3:40

In other media
 The video for "Alive with the Glory of Love" makes a three-second appearance on a television set on the movie Bridge to Terabithia.
 The song was featured on the Scrubs season 6 finale episode, "My Point of No Return", and was also featured in the season 7 premiere, "My Own Worst Enemy".
 The single features on a Kerrang! CD entitled "Kerrang! Under The Influence: The Songs That Inspired My Chemical Romance" as a tribute to Say Anything and to their songs.
"Alive with the Glory of Love" is also featured in the professional snowboarder Marco Smolla's section on the DVD Prediculous.

Charts

References

2004 singles
Say Anything (band) songs
2004 songs
Songs written by Max Bemis
Songs about the Holocaust